OSC Bremerhaven is a German sports club based in Bremerhaven, in the federal state of Bremen.

History
The club was founded in 1972 as Olympischer Sport-Club Bremerhaven in a merger of various local football clubs including ATS Bremerhaven, which has roots going back to 1859, Polizei Sportverein, TuS Bremerhaven 93, and the Judo-Klub. They are the largest sports club in the city, claiming some 4500 members, but football is not their primary focus. Their minor league side currently competes at the tier V level after a decade spent in tiers II and III, from the mid-70s through to the mid-80s.

OSC can make a strong claim to being the successor to TuS Bremerhaven 93, which was officially disbanded in 1974. While many members of TuS 93 joined OSC, others continued to field a separate football team until 1977. In 1991, the football players left OSC en masse to form FC Bremerhaven, leaving OSC with just a rump side. The TuS 93 was a quite successful side in northern German football, playing in the Oberliga Nord (I) from 1948 to 1963 and then in the Regionalliga Nord (II) until 1974.

Nowadays the club plays in the highest league in the state, the Bremen-Liga.

Honours

TuS Bremerhaven 93
 Oberliga Nord (I)
 Runners-up: 1955
 Amateurliga Bremen (II)
 Champions: 1948

OSC Bremerhaven
 Oberliga Nord (III)
 Champions: 1977
 Runners-up: 1979
 Bremer Pokal
 Winners: 1981, 1984

References

External links
 
 The Abseits Guide to German Soccer

Football clubs in Germany
OSC Bremerhaven
Sport in Bremerhaven
Association football clubs established in 1972
1972 establishments in Germany
2. Bundesliga clubs